Anthoston is an unincorporated community and census-designated place (CDP) in Henderson County, Kentucky, United States. There is no direct access to it from I-69.

Anthoston Had a radio station that went on the air in 1970 WAUZ At 103.1MHz FM Later became WBIC, WHKC and WGBF-FM. Their tower and transmitter were moved to the present location in 1987.

Anthoston was first listed as a CDP in 2014, so no census population figures are available for it.

Demographics

References

Census-designated places in Henderson County, Kentucky
Census-designated places in Kentucky